LGBT Youth Scotland is a Scottish youth organisation dedicated to the inclusion of lesbian, gay, bisexual and transgender (LGBT) young people from 13 to 25 year of age in Scotland. It was established in November 1989 as the Stonewall Youth Project by members of the LGBT community in Edinburgh.

In April 2003 Stonewall Youth Project became a national organisation and was incorporated as a company limited by guarantee with charitable status under the name by which it is known today.

History
LGBT Youth Scotland was originally founded in Edinburgh in 1989 as Stonewall Youth Project. In 2003 it was renamed as LGBT Youth Scotland and became a national organisation for young LGBT people.

Organisation and funding
LGBT Youth Scotland is based in Edinburgh and also has offices in Glasgow and Dumfries. James Rennie was appointed its first chief executive in 2003, having worked with the organisation from 1997 to 2008. Rennie was dismissed from his post after a Lothian and Borders Police investigation (Operation Algebra) and trial found him guilty of running Scotland's largest paedophile network using company resources and possessing child pornography in 2009. The organisation distanced itself from Rennie and subsequently appointed Fergus McMillan to the position who served for eleven years from 2008 to 2019. Since September 2019, the organisation has been led by chief executive Mhairi Crawford.

The organisation is mainly funded by the state, with over £700,000 of its £1.2 million 2018-19 income coming from the Scottish Government, local councils and the National Health Service. Non-state donors include BBC Children in Need and the Big Lottery Fund. It employs 42 staff.

Programmes 
Services provided by LGBT Youth Scotland include:  Direct Services for LGBT young people including support groups, advice and support, events and volunteering, National Projects including LGBT History Month, Policy work, Research, Training for Professionals. In November 2008, LGBT Youth Scotland began providing volunteering opportunities for those over the age of 26 as a part of the National Development Team's Capacity Building Project. Unlike many youth-steered organisations, LGBT Youth Scotland is not completely peer led, and relies upon experienced volunteers and paid staff to keep services running. The organisation is one of the largest employers in Scotland within the LGBT sector with over 30 full-time paid staff members, with many more part-time staff and volunteers.

LGBT young people are involved directly by their formation and support of Scotland's LGBT National Youth Council (NYC). The NYC is made up of elected youth representatives from all across Scotland, and is responsible for gathering the views, issues and aspirations of Scotland's LGBT youth population in order to feed them back to the people who can make a real difference, such as MSPs and local authorities. It brings together youth groups as well as individuals under one umbrella organisation.  The service users elect two members of the Scottish Youth Parliament. In 2004 the youth volunteers of the organisation won the Philip Lawrence Award for Community Safety. LGBT Youth Scotland's Charter encourages and enables organisations and, since 2014, schools to proactively include LGBTI people in every aspect of their work - with the aim of protecting staff and demonstrating a commitment to the provision of high quality services to customers, students, and service users.

See also
 Equality Network
 LGBT Network
 Time for Inclusive Education

References

External links
LGBT Youth Scotland Website

LGBT organisations in Scotland
LGBT culture in Scotland
Youth organisations based in Scotland
LGBT youth organisations based in the United Kingdom
Youth councils
1989 establishments in Scotland
Organisations based in Edinburgh
LGBT culture in Edinburgh
LGBT culture in Glasgow